The 1984 Davidson Wildcats football team represented Davidson College as a member of the Southern Conference during the 1984 NCAA Division I-AA football season. Led by eleventh-year head coach Ed Farrell, the Wildcats compiled an overall record of 2–8 with a mark of 0–5 in conference play, placing last out of nine teams in the SoCon. Although not SoCon members, their games against Penn and James Madison were designated Southern Conference games.

Schedule

References

Davidson
Davidson Wildcats football seasons
Davidson Wildcats football